Karagavayal is a village in the Pattukkottai taluk of Thanjavur district, Tamil Nadu, India.

Demographics 

As per the 2001 census, Karagavayal had a total population of 1769 with 863 males and 906 females. The sex ratio was 1050. The literacy rate was 81.75.

References 

 

Villages in Thanjavur district